Andrzej Kostenko (born June 24, 1936, Łódź, Poland) is a Polish screenwriter, film director, actor, and cinematographer. He is known for his collaborations with Roman Polanski, including some of Polanski's short films.

Filmography
As a director
 Patience de Maigret (1994)
 Maigret se défend (1993)
 The Evolution of Snuff (1978)
 Sam na sam (1977)
 Rewizja osobista (1973)

As a cinematographer
 Las katynski (1990)
 Rece do góry (1981)
 The Evolution of Snuff (1978)
 Rewizja osobista (1973)
 Qu'est-ce qui fait courir Jacky? (1969)
 Zywot Mateusza (1967)
 Ssaki (1962)

As a writer
 Patience de Maigret (1994)
 Maigret se défend (1993)
 Rece do góry (1981)
 The Evolution of Snuff (1978)
 Sam na sam (1977)Rewizja osobista (1973)
 Départ, Le (1967)

As an actor
 Wszystko na sprzedaz (1969)
 Gdy spadają anioly (1959)
 Zamach (1959)
 Co rekne zena? (1958)

External links
 

1936 births
Living people
Polish male actors
Polish film directors